"Grass Ain't Greener"  is a song by American singer Chris Brown released on May 5, 2016 as the lead single from Brown's eight studio album, Heartbreak on a Full Moon. The song was written by Brown and Prince Chrishan, and produced by Nikhil. "Grass Ain't Greener" is a mid-tempo alternative R&B and trap song, that explores themes of breakup and untrusting love relationships.

The song obtained positive reviews from music critics, who complimented its lyrical production and Brown's overall performance. Some noted it as Brown's first introduction to "dark R&B". The song received moderate success, being certified platinum by the Recording Industry Association of America (RIAA), Platinum by Australian Recording Industry Association (ARIA), and silver by the British Phonographic Industry (BPI).

A music video, shot in the desertified surroundings of Los Angeles, and in a forest outside Fresno, California, was released on August 26, 2016, and displays, though a "cinematic" and "dark" atmosphere, a "mysterious" storyline about Brown following his ex-girlfriend to a foggy club that ends up being full of vampires.

Background, recording and release
The song was one of the first tracks that Brown recorded for his eight studio album, Heartbreak on a Full Moon. It was recorded in late 2015 at Record Plant, in Los Angeles, California

On January 10, 2016, Brown previewed some unreleased songs on his Periscope and Instagram profiles, showing him dancing and lip-synching these songs in the studio, and "Grass Ain't Greener" was one of these songs. On April 27, Brown announced the mixtape Before the Trap: Nights in Tarzana, the European leg of his One Hell of a Nite Tour, and the publication of a new single on May 5. On May 3 he has revealed that the single published will be "Grass Ain't Greener", showing its cover art and announcing it as the first single from his upcoming album titled Heartbreak on a Full Moon. The single was released on May 5, 2016, the day of Brown's 27th birthday, but it was originally not included on the album's first announced track listing, then it was re-included on the official tracklist as a bonus track when the album was available for pre-order.

Composition and lyrics
"Grass Ain't Greener" is an alternative R&B, mid-tempo song, with a bouncy tune, that features influences from trap music in its production. The song was entirely written by Brown and Prince Chrishan, while the production of the song, based on roland TR-808 drums, was handled by Nikhil Seetharam. After the first two sung verses, Brown visits his rapping skills in the final verse of the song. Lyrically, the song tells a story of how his side girl became his main girl and their relationship changed and ended for the worse, combining passion and romance, even though Brown is wary of the intentions of his female liaisons. The crooner calls out the ex for fronting and admits he's fed up with blowing up her phone, as he sings "I know what you want, but you're not gon' get it / You do what you want with somebody else / I'm gone, baby".

Critical reception
Carl Lamare of Billboard said that the song is "Brown first major attempt at the whole "dark R&B" craze, and it works perfectly" describing its composition as "brutally honest lyrics over a beat that's somber, but danceable". Adam Fleischer of MTV said that Brown on the song sings about "how the two don't play nicely together no more", commending Brown's "heartfelt vocals" and its lyrics, which he found to be "very releatable to his private life". XXLs writer Mark Stainser said that the song's production "matches impeccably Brown's voice", defining it "one of the best R&B cuts of 2016".

Music video
On August 26, 2016, Brown uploaded the music video for "Grass Ain't Greener" on his YouTube and Vevo account. The videoclip was shot in August in the desertified surroundings of Los Angeles, and in a forest outside Fresno, California.

The video starts with Chris and his friends of his OHB group (one of them being Famous Fresh) driving on a lonely road in the dark. His friends tease him on how he's “always chasing girls” and mention that his ex may be where they're headed. Then the guys finally arrive to foggy club with "cool fluorescent lights", where dancers in lingerie laying in hoops that are hanging from the ceiling. Brown looks around while flashes of a girl (his ex) pop up in his mind. The girl is dressed in tribal-like clothing with her hair teased and white paint on her body. The dancers end up being vampires and the dancer takes a bite into Chris' neck. Chris starts to chase around a girl in a black bikini top and she looks like the same girl who took a bite out of his neck. He basically takes a trip to another world when he's in a grey, forest-like setting where people are running and jumping through the trees. The video ends with the girl he was having flashes of in the beginning of the video. She seductively looks at the camera before she turns and walks away into the forest.

Reception
Capital XTRA called the video "cinematic" and "dark". A writer for Rap-Up described the video as "mysterious". The sites 2DBZ and Urban Islandz noted that the girl that is supposed to be the ex-girlfriend of Brown in the video could be reportedly referred to Karrueche Tran.

Charts

Weekly charts

Year-end charts

Certifications

Release history

References

2016 singles
2016 songs
Chris Brown songs
RCA Records singles
Songs written by Chris Brown
Songs written by Christopher Dotson
Trap music songs
Alternative R&B songs